The list of members of the National Assembly of Hungary (2022–2026) is the list of members of the National Assembly – the unicameral legislative body of Hungary – according to the outcome of the Hungarian parliamentary election of 2022.

Officials

Speaker
 László Kövér (Fidesz)

First Officer
 Márta Mátrai (Fidesz)

Deputy Speaker for Legislation
 Csaba Hende (Fidesz)

Deputy Speakers
 Dóra Dúró (Mi Hazánk)
 István Jakab (Fidesz)
 János Latorcai (KDNP)
 Sándor Lezsák (Fidesz)
 Lajos Oláh (DK)

Recorders

 András Aradszki (KDNP)
 Bernadett Bakos (LMP)
 Sándor Berki (PM) (from May 17, 2022)
 Dávid Dócs (Mi Hazánk)
 László Földi (KDNP)
 Attila Gelencsér (Fidesz)
 Dezső Hiszékeny (MSZP)

 Béla Mihálffy (KDNP) (from June 14, 2022)
 József Attila Móring (KDNP) (May 2, 2022 – June 14, 2022)
 Sándor Szabó (MSZP)
 Lajos Szűcs (Fidesz)
 István Tiba (Fidesz)
 Győző Vinnai (Fidesz)
 Dániel Z. Kárpát (Jobbik)

Father of the House
 Béla Turi-Kovács (Fidesz) (age 86 in 2022)

Baby of the House
 Miklós Hajnal (Momentum) (age 27 in 2022)

Parliamentary groups

Members of the National Assembly

By name

See also

Notes

References 

Hungary
Lists of members of the National Assembly of Hungary
2022 establishments in Hungary